Ernocornutia altovolans is a species of moth of the family Tortricidae. It is found in Peru.

The wingspan is 18 mm. The ground colour of the forewings is brownish cream, sprinkled and suffused with greyish brown. The markings are darker than the ground colour. The hindwings are pale cream, but whiter basally and strigulated (finely streaked) with grey.

Etymology
The species name refers to collection site of the species in Peru and is derived from Latin altus (meaning high) and volans (meaning flying).

References

Moths described in 2010
Euliini
Moths of South America
Taxa named by Józef Razowski